David Correia is an American scholar and activist, and an associate professor of American Studies at the University of New Mexico, where his classes focus on the relationship between culture, politics, and the environment.

Education and career

Correia completed his undergraduate study in Anthropology at the University of Iowa and earned a Ph.D. in Geography from the University of Kentucky in 2006. Prior to his current appointment at the University of New Mexico, Correia taught at the University of Maine.

In 2012 Correia was the recipient of the University of New Mexico's "Arts and Sciences Award for Teaching Excellence."

Activism

Correia has been frequently quoted and interviewed regarding police reform in the city of Albuquerque. Albuquerque police have killed 27 people since 2010.  In April 2014, the Justice Department issued a report, based on a long investigation, castigating the Albuquerque Police Department for engaging in "an unconstitutional pattern or practice of excessive force, including deadly force."

On June 2, 2014 Correia and some two dozen other protesters participated in a non-violent sit-in at the office of Mayor Richard Berry. The demonstration was organized in response to the ongoing Albuquerque police shootings, including the April 21 killing of 19-year-old Mary Hawkes and the May 3 death of Armand Martin.

Thirteen protesters were arrested at the June 2 sit-in, including Correia, who was arrested for allegedly assaulting a police officer.  Fellow protesters disputed the charges, claiming that "Correia had his arms by his side and attempted to walk past the guard, who then bumped him against a wall."  Video taken during the protest seems to corroborate Correia's claim to innocence.  Correia pleaded not guilty and the case was reviewed by the District Attorney. The charges were later dropped.

Since his arrest, Correia has received support from the American Association of University Professors, the Association of American Geographers, and a Change.org petition which has collected upwards of 4,000 signatures.

Writing

In 2013 Correia published Properties of Violence: Law and Land Grant Struggle in Northern New Mexico which traces the story of the much-contested Tierra Amarilla land grant from its origins in 1832 to the present day.  According to the publisher, the book "provocatively suggests that violence is not the opposite of property but rather is essential to its operation." MacArthur "genius grant" recipient Don Mitchell called the book "engaged, critical, historical geography as it ought to be done."

Correia also writes extensively on questions of environmental and economic justice for the local alternative press. He penned the manifesto of the environmental blog La Jicarita, subtitled "Environmental Politics as if People Really Mattered," describing the site as striving to be a "place where radical political action can be considered and debated" and one that rejects "the bourgeois notion that the individual is the privileged political actor in society," arguing instead for collective efforts to save the environment.

In an article for Capitalism Nature Socialism about popular author Jared Diamond titled "F**k Jared Diamond" Correia opines that Diamond's Pulitzer Prize winning book Guns, Germs and Steel was "dull," and "chockfull of the bad and the worse, the random and the racist." Correia's critique stems from his assertion that Diamond "develops an argument about human inequality based on a determinist logic that reduces social relations such as poverty, state violence, and persistent social domination, to inexorable outcomes of geography and environment."

Bibliography

References

American activists
University of Iowa alumni
University of New Mexico faculty
Living people
People from Albuquerque, New Mexico
Year of birth missing (living people)